These are data codes for Switzerland.

Country

These are codes for the country itself. See country code for a fuller explanation.

CH ISO country code (ISO 3166-1 alpha-2, two letter)
Internet Country code top-level domain (ccTLD) (see .ch)
Distinguishing sign of vehicles in international traffic
International Union of Railways alphabetical UIC Country Code
WIPO ST.3
CHE ISO country code (ISO 3166-1 alpha-3, three letter code)

EO39  Nomenclature of Territorial Units for Statistics (NUTS)
HB  ICAO aircraft registration prefix (since 1935, before: CH)
HBA-HBZ,HEA-HEZ ITU callsign prefix
LS  ICAO airport code or nationality letters for location indicator (see also: List of airport codes: LS)
SUI IOC country code
FIFA country code
ITU letter codes for member-countries
SW  WMO message header country code
SZ  FIPS country code
Library of Congress machine-readable cataloguing country code

41  Country calling code
85  International Union of Railways numeric UIC Country Code
228  E.212 Mobile country code
269  ITU maritime identification digits
756 ISO country code (ISO 3166-1 numeric, numeric code)
760-769 GS1 prefix of GTIN (barcodes) by GS1 Switzerland

ШВА Cyrillic three-letter country codes per GOST 7.67 or ISO 3166-88 standard

NUTS-2 regions

As a member of the EFTA, Switzerland is included in the Nomenclature of Territorial Units for Statistics (NUTS). The three NUTS levels are:
 NUTS-1: Switzerland (CH0)
 NUTS-2: 7 Regions
 NUTS-3: 26 Cantons

The seven NUTS-2 regions are the following:

Below the NUTS levels, there are two LAU levels (LAU-1: districts; LAU-2: municipalities).

Cantons

The two-letter abbreviations are widely used, e.g. on car license plates and as disambiguator for localities on postal addresses if two localities in different cantons have the same name. They are also used with the prefix "CH-" as ISO 3166-2 codes of Switzerland, e.g. CH-SZ for the canton of Schwyz.

SFSO also uses a numerical code ordering the cantons by their constitutional order (1 to 26).

The FIPS 10-4 region codes of Switzerland were used by the United States government. This standard was withdrawn in 2008.

The NUTS-3 codes are used by the European Union.

Districts
Districts are assigned three-digit numerical codes by SFSO.

Districts are used as LAU-1 level.

Municipalities
See Community Identification Number#Switzerland

Municipalities are used as LAU-2 level.

Localities
See Postal codes in Switzerland and Liechtenstein

Airports
See
List of airports by ICAO code: L#LS – Switzerland
List of airports in Switzerland

See also

Switzerland-related lists